Viktoriya Kravchenko (born 18 January 1979) is a Paralympian athlete from Ukraine competing mainly in category T37 sprint events.

She competed in the 2008 Summer Paralympics in Beijing, China.  There she won a silver medal in the women's 100 metres - T37 event and a silver medal in the women's 200 metres - T37 event

External links
 

1979 births
Living people
Paralympic athletes of Ukraine
Paralympic silver medalists for Ukraine
Athletes (track and field) at the 2008 Summer Paralympics
Athletes (track and field) at the 2012 Summer Paralympics
Medalists at the 2008 Summer Paralympics
Medalists at the 2012 Summer Paralympics
Paralympic medalists in athletics (track and field)
Ukrainian female sprinters
20th-century Ukrainian women
21st-century Ukrainian women